The Official Opposition Shadow Cabinet of Tony Leon was announced on 23 August 2000 as a coalition between the Democratic Alliance (then known as the Democratic Party) and the New National Party.

Official Opposition Shadow  Cabinet Team

Additional Members in Attendance

References

South African shadow cabinets
Democratic Alliance (South Africa)